Bill Damianos (born 18 April 1977) is an Australian football (soccer) player.

Damianos played for Skoda Xanthi F.C. in the Greek Super League, appearing in 24 league matches during the 1998–99 season., 9 matches during the 1999–00 season and 6 matches during the 2000–01 season.

References

1977 births
Living people
Australian people of Greek descent
Australian soccer players
Australian expatriate soccer players
National Soccer League (Australia) players
South Melbourne FC players
Xanthi F.C. players
Expatriate footballers in Greece
Association football midfielders